Rhodobacterales are an order of the Alphaproteobacteria.

Gene transfer agents are viruslike elements produced by Rhodobacterales which transfer DNA and may be an important factor in their evolution.

Etymology

From Greek rhodon, the rose, and bakterion, a rod.  This refers to the colour of aerobic phototrophic cultures of this order of bacteria which can be pink or red due to the production of carotenoids.

References

Further reading

Scientific journals

Scientific books

External links

 
Alphaproteobacteria